Cumberland Basin is an inlet and northeasternmost part of the Bay of Fundy, located on the border between the Canadian provinces of Nova Scotia and New Brunswick.

The Isthmus of Chignecto lies directly northeast of the basin, and Shepody Bay joins the Cumberland Basin near its entrance into the larger water body, Chignecto Bay.

Along the Nova Scotia shore of Cumberland Basin at Joggins are seaside cliffs famous for fossils. Several coal seams are also exposed. These were mined commercially for Bituminous coal for nearly 140 years, between 1819 and 1958.

The fishery in Cumberland Basin is mainly limited to shad and lobster.

Bodies of water of Nova Scotia
Bodies of water of New Brunswick
Landforms of Cumberland County, Nova Scotia
Landforms of Westmorland County, New Brunswick
Borders of Nova Scotia
Borders of New Brunswick
Inlets of Canada